During the 2018–19 season, PSV Eindhoven participated in the Eredivisie, the KNVB Cup, the Johan Cruyff Shield and the UEFA Champions League.

Season summary

The season was Mark van Bommel's first season as manager of PSV. He replaced Philip Cocu, who joined Fenerbahçe after five seasons at PSV, during which the club won three national titles.

PSV started the season as defending Eredivisie champions, which qualified them for the Johan Cruyff Shield against cup winners Feyenoord. The match was scoreless after 90 minutes and went straight to a penalty shootout, which Feyenoord won 6–5. In the Eredivisie, PSV finished in second place despite winning their first 13 matches, three points behind Ajax. Although they did not win the league, they did break an Eredivisie record by scoring at least one goal in each of their first 32 matches (out of 34). PSV's campaign in the KNVB Cup was a disappointment, as they were knocked out in the second round by Eerste Divisie side RKC Waalwijk.

PSV qualified for the group stage of the UEFA Champions League by eliminating BATE Borisov in the play-off round. They were drawn into group B against Inter Milan, Barcelona and eventual finalists Tottenham Hotspur. PSV finished their group in fourth and last place, picking up only two points.

Squad

Friendlies

Competitions

Johan Cruyff Shield

Eredivisie

League table

Results summary

Matches

KNVB Cup

UEFA Champions League

Qualifying rounds

Group stage

Statistics

Appearances and goals

|-

|}

Disciplinary record

Transfers

In:

Out:

References

PSV Eindhoven seasons
PSV Eindhoven
PSV Eindhoven